Hilliar Township is one of the twenty-two townships of Knox County, Ohio, United States.  The 2010 census found 3,715 people in the township, 1,942 of whom lived in the unincorporated portions of the township.

Geography
Located in the southwestern corner of the county, it borders the following townships:
South Bloomfield Township, Morrow County - north
Liberty Township - northeast corner
Milford Township - east
Bennington Township, Licking County - southeast corner
Hartford Township, Licking County - south
Trenton Township, Delaware County - southwest corner
Porter Township, Delaware County - west
Bennington Township, Morrow County - northwest corner

The village of Centerburg is located in central Hilliar Township.

The farthest west township in Knox County, it is the only township that borders Delaware County.

Name and history
Hilliar Township was established in 1818. It was named for Dr. Richard Hilliar, a pioneer settler and landowner.

It is the only Hilliar Township statewide.

Government
The township is governed by a three-member board of trustees, who are elected in November of odd-numbered years to a four-year term beginning on the following January 1. Two are elected in the year after the presidential election and one is elected in the year before it. There is also an elected township fiscal officer, who serves a four-year term beginning on April 1 of the year after the election, which is held in November of the year before the presidential election. Vacancies in the fiscal officership or on the board of trustees are filled by the remaining trustees.

References

External links
County website

Townships in Knox County, Ohio
Townships in Ohio